The First Congregational Church is a church located in downtown Portland, Oregon, listed on the National Register of Historic Places. Construction took place over a period of six years, from 1889 to 1895. The building was designed by Swiss architect Henry J. Hefty in Venetian Gothic style. The interior includes stained-glass windows, commissioned in 1906, made by Portland's Povey Brothers Studio.

See also
 Carrie B. Wilson Adams (renowned sacred music composer and church organist during the early 20th century)
 Horace Lyman
 National Register of Historic Places listings in Southwest Portland, Oregon

References

External links
 
 

1895 establishments in Oregon
19th-century United Church of Christ church buildings
Churches completed in 1895
Churches in Portland, Oregon
Gothic Revival church buildings in Oregon
National Register of Historic Places in Portland, Oregon
Churches on the National Register of Historic Places in Oregon
Southwest Portland, Oregon
Venetian Gothic architecture in the United States
Portland Historic Landmarks